Coleophora jerusalemella is a moth of the  family Coleophoridae. It is found in Spain, Greece, on Crete and Cyprus and in Algeria, Lebanon, the Palestinian Territories, Syria, Saudi Arabia, Oman, Iran, Jordan and the United Arab Emirates.

The larvae feed on the leaves of Inula viscosa.

References

jerusalemella
Moths described in 1942
Moths of Europe
Moths of Africa
Moths of Asia